Lifesaving was introduced as a World Games sport at the 1985 World Games in London.

Medalists

Men

50 m Manikin Carry

100 m Manikin Carry with Fins

100 m Manikin Tow with Fins

100 m Rescue Medley

200 m Obstacle Swim

200 m Super Lifesaver

4 x 25 m Manikin Relay

4 x 50 m Medley Relay

4 x 50 m Obstacle Relay

4 x 50 m Rescue Tube Relay

2 x 2 m Rescue Ball Relay

Beach Flags

Board Race

Oceanman

Surf Race

Overall Team
Note:

Women

50 m Manikin Carry

100 m Manikin Carry with Fins

100 m Manikin Tow with Fins

100 m Rescue Medley

200 m Obstacle Swim

200 m Super Lifesaver

4 x 25 m Manikin Relay

4 x 50 m Medley Relay

4 x 50 m Obstacle Relay

4 x 50 m Rescue Tube Relay

2 x 2 Rescue Ball Relay

Beach Flags

Board Race

Oceanwoman

Surf Race

Overall Team
Note:

References

External links
 World Games at Sports123 by Internet Archive
 ILS World Games Results
 World Games 2013

 
Surf lifesaving
Sports at the World Games